Sandra C. Allen (born c. 1943) is a Democratic politician in Washington, D.C. She was elected as the Ward 8 member of the Council of the District of Columbia in 1996 and served in that position until 2005.

Political career
 November 4, 1986 - elected Advisory Neighborhood Commissioner for district 8E03
 November 8, 1988 - re-elected Advisory Neighborhood Commissioner for district 8E03
 November 6, 1990 - re-elected to a third term as Advisory Neighborhood Commissioner for district 8E03
 November 6, 1994 - returned for a fourth, non-consecutive, term as Advisory Neighborhood Commissioner for district 8E03, after one term off the Commission (Bonnie J. Ross was elected in 1992)
 May 2, 1995 - ran for Ward 8 council member in special election to replace Marion Barry, who had become mayor, but was defeated by Eydie Whittington, Barry's chosen successor, by a two-vote margin  
 September 10, 1996 - defeated Whittington in Democratic primary

 November 5, 1996 - elected Ward 8 council member
 November 7, 2000 - reelected Ward 8 council member
 September 14, 2004 - ran for reelection but was defeated in primary by Marion Barry

References

Members of the Council of the District of Columbia
Women city councillors in the District of Columbia
20th-century American politicians
20th-century American women politicians
21st-century American politicians
21st-century American women politicians
Washington, D.C., Democrats

Living people

1940s births
Year of birth uncertain